Widow Donaldson Place is a historic home located at Peters Township in Franklin County, Pennsylvania. It was built about 1775, and is a two-story, log dwelling, measuring 24 feet by 20 feet. It has a full-length, two-story front porch and massive rubble sandstone chimney. Also on the property is a late-18th or 19th century summer kitchen.

It was listed on the National Register of Historic Places in 1987.

References 

Houses on the National Register of Historic Places in Pennsylvania
Houses completed in 1775
Houses in Franklin County, Pennsylvania
National Register of Historic Places in Franklin County, Pennsylvania